A debt club, also known as a money group is a group of individuals who meet on a regular basis for the purpose of helping each other to reduce their debt.

Club members share money-saving techniques, financial planning advice, dealing with credit card debt and how to improve credit scores.

Debt clubs are similar to investment clubs in that regular individuals get together to help each other by sharing advice and personal experiences.  Unlike some investment clubs, debt clubs do not involve sharing money between members, and therefore involve much less risk, if any.

Like most clubs, members gain the support of being part of a group of like-minded individuals with a common goal.  Debt club members help to motivate each other and are often more effective than when they try to go it alone.

Managing debt is often undertaken only when it has reached a crisis, as many people regard financial planning as complex and beyond the average person's abilities.  Many self-help books attempt to teach basic techniques to help people get out of debt or avoid going into debt in the first place.  Oprah Winfrey has popularized this idea through the eight-step Debt Diet presented on her television series.

See also
Strike Debt

Debt